Braintree Town Football Club is a semi-professional football club based in Braintree, Essex, England.

History
The club was formed on 24 September 1898 as Manor Works, the works team of the Crittall Window Company, from which they gained their nickname Iron. The new club took over the fixtures of the recently defunct Braintree F.C. in the North Essex League, and also took on most of the former club's players. They left the league in 1900, but returned in 1901. They won the title in 1905–06, 1910–11 and 1911–12, also winning the Mid-Essex League in 1909–10 and 1910–11. In 1911 they also joined Division 2A of the Essex & Suffolk Border League, remaining in the league until 1928.

In 1921 they were renamed Crittall Athletic to be more closely identified with their parent company. After winning Division Two (Western) in 1922–23 and 1923–24, they were promoted to the Senior Division of the Border League in 1925. In 1928 they joined the Spartan League, and in 1935 were founder members of the Eastern Counties League, although they also continued to play in the Border League. They won the Border League in 1935–36 and both the Border League and the Eastern Counties League in 1936–37, but then left the Eastern Counties League to join the newly established Essex County League. The new league folded after a single season (in which Crittall were runners-up) and the club returned to the Eastern Counties League.

After World War II the Eastern Counties League did not resume in 1945, so Crittall joined the Eastern Division of the London League instead. After finishing second in their first season, they were promoted to the Premier Division. They were invited to rejoin the Eastern Counties League in 1947, but turned the offer down and remained in the London League, where they won the League Cup twice before returning to the Eastern Counties League in 1952. In 1954 they turned professional, but financial problems forced them to revert to amateur status and drop back down into the Border League at the end of the 1954–55 season.

In 1959–60 they won the league and League Cup double. They switched to the Greater London League in 1964, and then to the Metropolitan League in 1966. They were renamed Braintree & Crittall Athletic in 1968, and after winning the League Cup in 1969–70, the club returned to the Eastern Counties League again. In 1981 all links with Crittall were severed and the club was renamed Braintree F.C., before adopting their current name a year later. They won their second Eastern Counties League title in 1983–84 and retained it the following season. In 1986–87 they won the Essex Senior Trophy and the following season they won the League Cup.

In 1991 Braintree moved up to the Southern Division of the Southern League. In 1996 the club asked the FA to switch leagues to reduce their travelling. After initially being refused, they were allowed to move to Division Three of the Isthmian League, although it was an effective drop of two divisions. They were promoted as runners-up in their first season, and repeated the feat the following season. After three seasons in Division One they were promoted to the Premier Division with a third-place finish in 2000–01. They won the Premier Division in 2005–06 to earn promotion to the Conference South. The season also saw them reach the first round of the FA Cup for the first time, eventually losing 4–1 at Shrewsbury Town.

Braintree qualified for the promotion play-offs in their first season in the Conference South, but lost 1–0 to Salisbury City in the final. They also reached the play-offs the following season, but lost to Eastbourne Borough in the semi-finals. In 2010–11 they finished as Conference South champions, earning promotion to the Conference Premier. The next four seasons saw the club reach the FA Cup for the first round, losing to Tranmere Rovers, Newport County, Chesterfield and Oxford United in successive seasons. In 2015–16 they finished third in the renamed National League, qualifying for the promotion play-offs. Despite winning the first leg at Grimsby Town 1–0, they lost the home leg 2–0 after extra time. In 2016–17 the club reached the second round of the FA Cup for the first time after beating Eastbourne Borough in the first round; they eventually lost 5–2 to Millwall in the second round. They were relegated from the National League at the end of the season after finishing in the bottom four.

The 2017–18 season saw Braintree finish sixth in the National League South. In the play-offs they defeated Hemel Hempstead Town and Dartford to reach the final, in which they beat Hampton & Richmond Borough 4–3 on penalties to earn promotion back to the National League. However, they were relegated to the National League South the following season after finishing second-from-bottom of the National League.

Reserve team
Braintree Town reserves joined Division One of the Eastern Counties League in 2012, remaining in the league until the end of the 2018–19 season.

Ground

After being founded, Manor Works initially played at the Fair Field, now the site of the town hall, library and bus station. They moved to Spaldings Meadow in Panfield Lane in 1903. In 1923 the club moved to a new ground on Cressing Road which had been built by their parent company. Due to problems with the pitch in 1975, the club were forced to play matches at several other venues, including Heybridge Swifts' Scraley Road (a single match on 26 April arranged at such short notice that many fans arrived at Cressing Road for the match and only 50 attended the game), Braintree Rugby Club's Tabor Avenue (at the start of the 1975–76 season) and the Courtaulds Sports Ground in Church Street in Bocking (a single match against Gorleston on 6 September 1975 with a crowd of 73).

Current squad

Honours
Conference South
Champions 2010–11
Isthmian League
Premier Division champions 2005–06
Metropolitan League 
League Cup winners 1969–70
Eastern Counties League
Champions 1936–37, 1983–84, 1984–85
League Cup winners 1987–88
London League
League Cup winners 1948–49, 1951–52
Essex & Suffolk Border League
Champions 1935–36, 1936–37, 1937–38, 1959–60
League Cup winners 1959–60
Division Two (Western) champions 1922–23, 1923–24
North Essex League
Champions 1905–06, 1910–11, 1911–12
Mid-Essex League
Champions 1909–10, 1910–11
Essex Senior Cup
Winners 1995–96
Essex Senior Trophy
Winners 1986–87

Records
Best FA Cup performance: Second round, 2016–17
Best FA Trophy performance: Fifth round, 2001–02
Best FA Vase performance: Fifth round, 1984–85, 1987–88
Biggest victory: 12–0 vs Thetford, Eastern Counties League, 1935–36
Heaviest defeat: 14–0 vs Chelmsford, North Essex League, 1923
Record attendance: 4.5 vs Barking, Essex Senior Cup, 1935–36; 4,000 vs Tottenham Hotspur, testimonial match, May 1952
Most appearances: Brad Quinton, 546
Most goals: Chris Guy, 211 (1983–1990)
Most goals in a season: Gary Bennett, 57 (1997–98)
Record transfer fee received: £40,000 from Barnet for Simeon Akinola

See also
Braintree Town F.C. players
Braintree Town F.C. managers

References

External links

Official website

 
Braintree, Essex
Football clubs in England
Football clubs in Essex
Association football clubs established in 1898
1898 establishments in England
Essex and Suffolk Border Football League
Eastern Counties Football League
Essex County League
London League (football)
Greater London League
Metropolitan League
Southern Football League clubs
Isthmian League
National League (English football) clubs
North Essex League
Mid-Essex Football League
Works association football teams in England
South Essex League